The Radiro Festival (also known as International Radio Orchestras Festival) is one of the biggest classical music festivals in the world, held in Romania.  It is the largest international festival dedicated to Radio Symphony Orchestras.

References

Official Festival website

External links
Official Festival website
 The largest Festival venue

Music festivals in Romania
Opera festivals
Classical music festivals in Romania
Radio festivals